Joseph Elliott Bunney (born 26 September 1993) is an English professional footballer who plays as a forward for Marine, on loan from Macclesfield.

He has previously played professionally in the Football League for Rochdale, Northampton Town, Bolton Wanderers, Hartlepool United and Grimsby Town as well as at Non-league level for Lancaster City, Kendal Town, Stockport County, Northwich Victoria, Matlock Town, Altrincham, Warrington Rylands and Ashton United.

Club career

Early career
Born in Gorton, Manchester, Bunney worked his way through Lancaster City's youth system and broke into their first team during the 2011–12 season as the club competed in the Northern Premier League Division One North, whilst studying sports science at Myerscough College in Preston, Lancashire.

Rochdale
Bunney made his début as a professional at Rochdale on 27 April 2013 as a substitute in a 1–0 victory against Plymouth Argyle, on the final day of the 2012–13 season with Bunney scoring the winning goal with a header after a cross from another débutante, Scott Tanser. On 1 July 2014, Bunney signed a new two-year contract at Rochdale.

Northampton Town
On 16 January 2018, Bunney signed for Northampton Town for an undisclosed fee.

On 25 June 2018, Bunney signed for Blackpool on loan.

On 31 January 2019, Bunney's loan at Blackpool was cut short and then loaned out to his former club Rochdale until the end of the season.

He was one of 3 transfer-listed by Northampton at the end of the 2018–19 season; a further 8 were released.

Bolton Wanderers
On 2 September 2019, Bunney signed for Bolton Wanderers on a free transfer from Northampton Town on a contract until the end of the season. The following weekend he was involved in a road traffic collision on the M55 motorway that left him with broken ribs and a broken collarbone. On 26 June it was announced Bunney would be one of 14 senior players released at the end of his contract on 30 June.

Matlock and Hartlepool
On 19 October 2020, Bunney signed for Matlock Town. He played two matches for the club, registering an assist in both games. A month later he signed for Hartlepool United on 30 November. He left on 26 January 2021 as he wanted to return to playing in the English Football League.

Grimsby Town
On 1 February 2021, Bunney joined League Two side Grimsby Town on a contract until the end of the 2020–21 season. Bunney had already played for Matlock and Hartlepool in the 2020–2021 season, usually meaning he wouldn't be able to sign for a third team as players can only play for two teams in one season – however FIFA changed the rules for that season to allow players to play for three teams, to alleviate the effects of the coronavirus pandemic on football.

On 18 March 2021, it was announced by manager Paul Hurst that Bunney had played his final game for the club after he was taken to hospital hours after a game against Carlisle United, and would effectively be leaving the club because of an unreported medical condition.

Back to Non League
On 25 August 2021, Bunney signed a contract for National League side Altrincham.

On 8 October 2021, it was announced Bunney had signed for Warrington Rylands.

On 2 June 2022, Bunney joined Scunthorpe United on trial and played in a 3–2 pre-season defeat against Middlesbrough.

Bunney signed with Macclesfield ahead of the 2022–23 season. In December 2022, Bunney joined Ashton United on a three month loan. In February 2023, he signed for Marine on loan until 1st April.

Career statistics

Club

Notes

Personal life
Bunney is in a relationship with England and Manchester United women's footballer Ella Toone.

References

External links
 

English footballers
English Football League players
Northern Premier League players
Lancaster City F.C. players
Kendal Town F.C. players
Stockport County F.C. players
Northwich Victoria F.C. players
Rochdale A.F.C. players
Northampton Town F.C. players
Bolton Wanderers F.C. players
Hartlepool United F.C. players
Grimsby Town F.C. players
Altrincham F.C. players
Warrington Rylands 1906 F.C. players
Macclesfield F.C. players
Ashton United F.C. players
Living people
Association football forwards
Footballers from Manchester
1993 births